St Valerie of Limoges (also Valeria of Limoges) is a legendary Christian martyr and cephalophore, associated with the Roman period, whose cult was very important in Limousin, France, in the medieval period. She has been an important subject for Christian art since the middle ages and for porcelain figurines over several centuries.

Dating and hagiography
The incident most insistently retold about St Valerie is that she was beheaded for her faith and then carried her own head to set before her bishop, Saint Martial, who had converted her. This firmly sets her in the Roman period, although later hagiographers had Saint Martial himself sent to Gaul by St. Peter rather than by Pope Fabian according to earlier tradition.

On the other hand, Valerie's legend is also retold with a Duke Stephen of Guyenne (Aquitaine) as her antagonist and executioner. According to this version, she was pressured to marry Duke Stephen, who was a pagan. For her refusal, he had her beheaded. This moves her into the medieval period, though precisely how it squares with her being a Christian in a pagan environment is unclear. Obviously the duke's name is Christian. There are neither recorded dukes of Aquitaine with that name nor any pagan dukes of Aquitaine.

Although she was considered the first martyr of Aquitaine, it is probably best to see Valerie as a legendary figure whose cult has nourished a certain amount of narrative elaboration, attracting narrative elements of varied, sometimes inconsistent, origins.

Parallels

The most obvious parallels to the legendary figure of St. Valerie are those that manifest the distinctive trait of cephalophory. France is fairly rich in these, including most notably the capital's patron saint, Denis. The severed head that goes on preaching is a powerful assertion of autonomy, or perhaps theonomy in the face of persecution, with the bishop Denis continuing his work of prophecy and preaching. In St Valerie's case, the severed head is returned to where it belongs, the deceased person's bishop, pastor and confessor. In both cases there is a continuity in the relationship to the Church beyond death.

The more basic theme of decapitation widens the field of comparison greatly. An obvious source of parallels is the deuterocanonical book of Judith, in which we find a young woman pledging herself to virginity after seducing and decapitating a tyrannical enemy of the faith, and presenting his head to her countrymen. The mythemes are differently configured, but there seem to be similar underlying concerns in which the faith community is threatened by both persecution and exogamy.

The most obvious parallels are perhaps with the Biblical and post-Biblical narrative of John the Baptist. Here we find not only a beheading, but a problematic marriage (with suggestions of incest rather than exogamy), defiant denunciation of tyranny, a centrally-important young woman and presentation of the head to a third party. Here, however, the threat to the faith community seems to come from inside. The thematic parallel, nevertheless, was strong enough for the builders to back St Valerie's shrine in St Michel des Lions with a fine stained glass window depicting John the Baptist.

Cult
St Valerie was venerated alongside Martial and her alleged remains buried alongside his at the Abbey of St Martial, in the city of Limoges. The original shrine was destroyed in a fire in the mid-10th century and a new building was erected. The reputed tomb of St Valerie under this building was among those uncovered in excavations under the Place de la République, Limoges, in 1960–62.

Around 985, at least part of the relics was transferred to the Benedictine abbey at Chambon-sur-Voueize, to the north-east of Limoges, which became a centre of her cult. A large 15th century painting of her martyrdom and a reliquary bust remain important centres of attention in the abbey. Images of the martyrdom became an important theme of Limousin art, both painting and sculpture, and later Limoges enamels.

After the destruction of the abbey at Limoges, the remaining relics of St Valerie were gathered together and installed alongside those of St Martial and St Loup of Limoges, in the Church of St Michel des Lions, in the commercial heart of Limoges.

Notes

References
 Bull, Marcus Graham and Catherine Léglu, The world of Eleanor of Aquitaine: literature and society in southern France, The Boydell Press, 2005.

External links
Chambon-sur-Voueize web site 

Christian saints in unknown century
Cephalophores
Gallo-Roman saints
Year of birth unknown